The 7th Vanier Cup was played on November 20, 1971, at Varsity Stadium in Toronto, Ontario, and decided the CIAU football champion for the 1971 season. The Western Mustangs won their first ever championship by defeating the Alberta Golden Bears by a score of 15-14.

References

External links
 Official website

Vanier Cup
Vanier Cup
1971 in Toronto
November 1971 sports events in Canada
Canadian football competitions in Toronto